Live! Live! Live! is a live EP by the Detroit, Michigan punk rock band The Suicide Machines, released in 1998 by Hollywood Records. It was a promotional EP released in preparation for their then-upcoming album Battle Hymns. It contains three songs recorded during performances on December 27 and 28, 1997 at St. Andrew's Hall in Detroit. The first two songs are tracks that appear on Battle Hymns, while the third, "Friends," was originally featured on the band's 1994 'Green World' cassette. The recording of "Hating Hate" from this EP was re-released on the compilation album The Least Worst of the Suicide Machines in 2002, along with a recording of "The Real You" from the same performance.

Track listing
All songs written by The Suicide Machines
"Hating Hate" – 1:06
"Face Another Day" – 1:43
"Friends" – 2:15

Personnel
Jason Navarro – vocals
Dan Lukacinsky – guitar, backing vocals
Royce Nunley – bass, backing vocals
Derek Grant – drums

Production
Julian Raymond – producer
The Suicide Machines – producers
Joe Barresi – mixing
Brian Young – mixing

The Suicide Machines albums
1998 EPs
Live EPs
1998 live albums
Hollywood Records live albums
Hollywood Records EPs
Albums produced by Julian Raymond